Václav Prošek (born 8 April 1993) is a Czech football player who currently plays for FK Ústí nad Labem. He has represented the Czech Republic at under-19 level.

References

External links
 
 

Czech footballers
Czech First League players
Czech National Football League players
1993 births
Living people
SK Slavia Prague players
FK Baník Sokolov players
Bohemians 1905 players
FC Silon Táborsko players
FK Ústí nad Labem players
Association football midfielders
Czech Republic youth international footballers